Xanthochlorus is a genus of flies in the family Dolichopodidae. It is the only member of the subfamily Xanthochlorinae. In some classifications, the genus is included in the subfamily Sympycninae.

Species
Xanthochlorus chinensis Yang & Saigusa, 2005 – China (Shaanxi)
Xanthochlorus flavicans Negrobov, 1978 – Tajikistan
Xanthochlorus fulvus Negrobov, 1978 – South Russia
Xanthochlorus galbanus Chandler & Negrobov, 2008 – Belgium, Denmark, Hungary, Italy, Russia (Kaliningrad), Great Britain
Xanthochlorus gansuensis Qilemoge, Chang & Yang, 2018 – China (Gansu)
Xanthochlorus helvinus Loew, 1861 – United States, Canada
Xanthochlorus henanensis Wang, Yang & Grootaert, 2008 – China (Henan)
Xanthochlorus kustovi Grichanov, 2010 – Madagascar
Xanthochlorus lucidulus Negrobov, 1978 – Kazakhstan, Uzbekistan, Tajikistan
Xanthochlorus luridus Negrobov, 1978 – Abkhazia, South Russia
Xanthochlorus nigricilius Olejnicek, 2004 – China (Shaanxi)
Xanthochlorus ochraceus Vaillant, 1952 – Algeria
Xanthochlorus ornatus (Haliday, 1832) – Europe, Egypt, Canary Islands
Xanthochlorus philippovi Negrobov, 1978 – Russia (Primorye)
Xanthochlorus silaceus Chandler & Negrobov, 2008 – Great Britain
†Xanthochlorus statzi Chandler & Negrobov, 2008 – Germany (Upper Oligocene) (replacement name for X. tenellus Statz, 1940)
Xanthochlorus tenellus (Wiedemann, 1817) – Europe
Xanthochlorus tewoensis Qilemoge, Chang & Yang, 2018 – China (Gansu)
Xanthochlorus tibetensis Xi, Wang & Yang, 2015 – China (Tibet)
Xanthochlorus ultramontanus Becker, 1918 – France

Synonyms:
Xanthochlorus bicolorellus (Zetterstedt, 1843): moved to Syntormon
Xanthochlorus flavellus (Zetterstedt, 1843): Synonym of Xanthochlorus tenellus (Wiedemann, 1817)
Xanthochlorus tarsatus Schiner, 1868 [Type locality: Nicobar Islands: Pulomilo Island]: moved to Chaetogonopteron
†Xanthochlorus tenellus Statz, 1940: renamed to Xanthochlorus statzi Chandler & Negrobov, 2008
Xanthochlorus tenellus (Fallén, 1823): Synonym of Xanthochlorus ornatus (Haliday, 1832)

Nomen nudum:
Xanthochlorus carthusianus Vaillant, 1978

References 

 Europe
 Nearctic

Dolichopodidae genera
Articles containing video clips
Xanthochlorinae
Taxa named by Hermann Loew
Diptera of Africa
Diptera of Asia
Diptera of Europe
Diptera of North America